Auguste-Arthur Plisson (died August 1832) was a French chemist. Born in Orléans, Plisson was orphaned at an early age, but overcame the difficulties that caused him with the determination he brought to being a student of chemistry in Paris. Taught by Nöel-Étienne Henry, chief of the Central Pharmacy of Paris Hospitals (Pharmacie centrale des hôpitaux de Paris, today the Agence générale des équipements et produits de santé), he won several awards from the School of Pharmacy of Paris, including a gold medal for chemistry in 1823, and was eventually recruited by Henry to work for the Central Pharmacy. After several years, during which he published a number of papers on chemical discoveries, he was appointed deputy chief. He was also a member of the Société de Pharmacie (today the Académie nationale de pharmacie).

By the late 1820s, Plisson had become chief pharmacist at Paris's Pitié-Salpêtrière Hospital. In 1827, with Étienne Ossian Henry, the son of his former tutor, he discovered aspartic acid.

Plisson died suddenly in 1832 as the result of an attack of cholera.

References

Citations

External links 
 

1832 deaths
19th-century French chemists
French science writers
Date of birth unknown